These lists of fossiliferous stratigraphic units in Africa enumerate the rock layers which preserve the fossilized remains of ancient life in Africa by the modern countries wherein they are found.

Geographical atlas

Clickable map of Africa.

See also

Lists of fossiliferous stratigraphic units

F